Don Juan in Hell is a 1991 Spanish drama film directed by Gonzalo Suárez. It was entered into the 17th Moscow International Film Festival.

Cast
 Fernando Guillén as Don Juan
 Mario Pardo as Esganarel
 Charo López as Doña Elvira
 Héctor Alterio as Padre de Don Juan
 Ana Álvarez as Chiquilla India
 Manuel de Blas as Buhonero
 Iñaki Aierra as Rey Felipe II (as Ignacio Aierra)
 Olegar Fedoro as Marido Luis de Moor
 Yelena Samarina as Dama Ermita
 Ayanta Barilli as Dama
 Alicia Sánchez as Prostituta

References

External links
 

1991 films
1991 drama films
Spanish drama films
1990s Spanish-language films
Films based on works by Molière
Spanish films based on plays
Films directed by Gonzalo Suárez
Films based on the Don Juan legend
1990s Spanish films